Hate List is a young adult novel written by Jennifer Brown and published in 2009 by Little, Brown Books for Young Readers. Jennifer Brown, who wrote a newspaper humor column for four years, switched to a more serious side for her debut novel, Hate List. The novel is set after a shooting incident at an American high school and deals with themes of hatred, bullying, family tension, and suicide.

Plot summary
The novel deals with the aftermath of a school shooting. It is a first person narrative from the point of view of Valerie Leftman, whose boyfriend Nick Levil was the shooter. Interspersed through the novel are newspaper articles about the events.

Valerie and Nick have compiled a Hate List, a list of people and things they hate; Valerie sees it as an inside joke between the two of them, but Nick is more serious. When he brings a gun to school and starts shooting people, Valerie puts herself in front of his next victim, Jessica Campbell, and is shot in the leg. After this, Nick kills himself. Once Valerie wakes up in the hospital to face the consequences, she soon realizes that she harbors some of the blame for the people who were killed or wounded. Had she not discussed before how much she hated them? Maybe even egged him on a little? With Nick gone, she's really the only one left to face the blame. Six months after the shooting, Valerie returns to school and steadily begins to cope with the loss of her boyfriend, the loss of her former friends, her family's resulting issues, and how it all will affect her future. People now view Nick as a monster, her classmates are torn between calling her a victim or a part of the whole plan, her friends no longer talk to her, her parents' marriage is ending, her brother resents her, the girl whose life she saved befriends her, and she considers the possibility of attending college even though her name is attached to the tragedy. This novel follows her as she learns to forgive, to stand up for herself, and journey from mental anguish to mental stability.

Awards
 American Library Association 2010 Best Books for Young Adults 
 Young Adult Library Services Association 2012 Popular Paperback 
 Michigan Library Association's Thumbs Up! Award 
 2012 Oklahoma Sequoyah Book Award
 A School Library Journal Best Book of 2009
 A 2009 Children’s Indie Next Pick
 A New York Public Library Book for the Teen Age
 A Young Adult Library Services Association Teens’ Top Ten Nominee
 A Bank Street Best Book of the Year
 A VOYA Perfect Ten
 A New Hampshire Flume Award nominee
 An Arkansas Teen Book Award Honorable Mention
 An Iowa High School Book Award finalist
 A Louisiana Teen Readers’ Choice Award Winner
 A Missouri Gateway Readers Award Winner

References

External links
 

2009 American novels
Little, Brown and Company books
Novels about bullying
Novels set in high schools and secondary schools
Young adult novels
2009 debut novels
Novels about mass murder